Dera Baba Badbhag Singh Gurudwara(देवनागरी: डेरा बाबा बड़भाग सिंह) is a shrine of Dera Baba Vadbhag Singh. It is located in Mairi village in the Indian state of Himachal Pradesh. It is known for Holi mela. Visitors come from North Indian states and union territories including Jammu and Kashmir, Punjab, Haryana, Delhi, Chandigarh and Himachal Pradesh.

Early life 

Baba Vadbhag Singh was born at Kartarpur in 1715 A.D. He was the son of Baba Ram Singh and Mata Raj Kaur. He was a descendant of Dhir Mal, the first cousin of Dasam Padshahi Guru Gobind Singh. He succeeded to the hereditary gaddi (religious seat) of Sodhis of Kartarpur. Many stories are told about him.

The shrine is about 10 km from Amb. Nehrian, a small hilly village serves as an entry point to the Holy place.  

Followers believe visiting the dera (shrine) cure patients possessed by evil spirits or affected with other malign influences.

Hola Mohalla fair
The Hola Mohalla fair is held at Dera Vadbhag Singh on the full moon day in the Vikrami month of Phalgun (February-March). The fair lasts for ten days i.e., a week before the full-moon and two days after. The fair is attended by those possessed people and their relatives or who seek protection against similar malign influences. 

The dolis (afflicted persons) are seated in rows while metal platters and drums are beaten to charm the evil spirits. During the drumming, the dolis who continue tossing and swaying their heads about are made to inhale the smoke of burning incense. A number of methods are adopted to torture the evil spirits until they leave the body. At that stage the spirit is asked to proceed to the dhaulidhar (waterfall) to which it agrees. The spirit is then questioned whether it has arrived and sees Baba Vadbhag Singh with a cage. When the spirit replies in the affirmative, it is asked to enter the cage and to request Baba Ji to shut the cage. The dolis is then seen to have recovered. Every visitor who attends the fair pays obeisance at the shrine besides taking a holy bath at the dhaulidhar or charan ganga, especially on the full moon–day. The devotees take the dhaulidhar's sacred water home. The most important ceremony at the shrine is the hoisting of the flag Nishan Sahib. It is done on the full moon day. The old Nishan Sahib is retired after recitation of supplication. The devotees try to obtain a piece of the old cloth or various other articles attached to the old flag, such as cowrie shells, betelnuts, or coins. Possession of these is regarded as a boon. Lacs of people attend the fair from Punjab, Uttar Pradesh, Delhi, Rajasthan and Himachal. The Sikhs of Doaba, Majha and Malwa tracts of Punjab especially are votaries of Vadbhag Singh and attend the fair in large numbers. Most of the women who attend the fair are possessed

Nearby places 
 Chintpurni Temple 
 Kamakhya Devi, Poliyan
 Sadashiv Mandir, Dhyunsar

References

 

Gurdwaras in Himachal Pradesh
Una, Himachal Pradesh
Religious tourism in India
Buildings and structures in Una district